Yaqoub Alhassan (born 7 February 2001) is a Saudi Arabian-born Malian professional footballer who plays as a winger for Pro League side Al-Taawoun.

Club career
Alhassan started his career at Al-Taawoun. On 10 February 2021, Alhassan signed his first professional contract with the club. On 26 August 2021, Alhassan made his professional debut for Al-Taawoun against Al-Nassr in the Pro League, replacing Yazeed Al-Bakr.

References

External links
 
 

2001 births
Living people
Malian footballers
Association football wingers
Saudi Professional League players
Al-Taawoun FC players